Kevin Davidson and The Voices formally "Kevin Davidson and the Voices of Binghampton" is an American Gospel music choir from Memphis, Tennessee.

Musical career
Currently signed with New Haven Records, the group formed in December 1988. Kevin Davidson and The Voices have received Stellar Award and Dove Award nominations and strong radio acceptance.

http://www.manta.com/coms2/dnbcompany_ddy902
Life Worship And Outreach Center, Inc   (Dominion Church Of Memphis)

References

Discography 
(1993) It's Possible [Kevin Davidson & The Voices of Binghampton]

(1995) I Searched the World [Kevin Davidson & The Voices of Binghampton]

(1996) Miracle Worker [Kevin Davidson & The Voices of Binghampton]

(1998) Celebrate [Kevin Davidson & The Voices]

(2000) Language of the Millennium [Kevin Davidson & The Voices]

(2001) Soultown USA [Kevin Davidson & The Voices]

(2003) Full Circle [Kevin Davidson & The Voices]

(2006) Overflow [Kevin Davidson & The Voices]

(2008) The Best of Kevin Davidson [Kevin Davidson & The Voices]

(2010) Chapter 1 - Compilation

(2014) Something Happens [Kevin Davidson & The UCICC Fellowship Choir]

American choirs
American gospel musical groups
Musical groups established in 1988